Robert Marion Eusebio Domingo (born September 27, 1989), professionally known as Robi Domingo, is a Filipino VJ, actor, dancer, and host. He first gained fame as a reality show contestant by joining and ending up as the first runner-up of the reality competition series Pinoy Big Brother: Teen Edition Plus in 2008, after which he became a member of ABS-CBN's group of film and television talents collectively known as Star Magic.

Early life and education
Robi Domingo was born on September 27, 1989 to parents who are both doctors. His father, Roberto "Boy" Domingo who acted as his guardian inside the PBB house, is a General Surgeon while his mother, Mary Ann Eusebio Domingo works as the company doctor of SSS. Domingo has a younger brother named Robert Marlo Domingo (known as Maro) who also went inside the PBB house for one day. He was in a relationship with former Ateneo Lady Eagle now turned host, Gretchen Ho.

Domingo has been attending Ateneo de Manila University since elementary and decided to continue studying there for his pre-med studies after exiting the PBB house. On March 23, 2012, Domingo graduated from college with a Bachelor of Science degree in health sciences. Instead of immediately going to medical school as he originally planned, he opted to take a year of absence from his studies to focus on his showbiz career. Domingo was expected to begin studying medicine sometime in June 2013, however, the latest influx of hosting projects offered to him this year convinced him to further postpone his return to school. He hasn't made any other announcements regarding his future school plans.

Career

Domingo, together with his fellow housemate Josef Elizalde, entered the Pinoy Big Brother house as the "Plus housemates". Their entry was given the "school rivalry" angle because they both came from schools that are considered as rivals in the Philippines. During the first week, they were given the secret task of convincing their housemates that they were "Best buds forever" who have been estranged for a number of years only to see each other again in the show's auditions. They were not able to succeed in their task because their ruse was discovered. Domingo would go on to be part of the Teen Big Four, eventually winning the Second Teen Big Placer award at the end of the season.

Shortly after exiting the PBB house, Domingo joined the cast of the Philippine remake of My Girl with Elizalde, and another ex-housemate, Nicole Uysiuseng. A few months later, Domingo joined another reality contest, the Myx VJ Search, which he eventually won with 3 others.  He was also given a regular spot in ABS-CBN's Sunday variety show, ASAP as part of the dance group, Gigger Boys. His next project was also with the group when he took the role of Arkin in Your Song Presents: Boystown. Aside from being a regular in the main show, he also started hosting the online counterpart of the show, ASAP Chill-Out, with his co-host/s changing over the years.

In late 2010, Domingo and his fellow Gigger Boys were launched as the hosts of the short-lived youth oriented teen variety show called Shoutout!. The show was cancelled on February 11, 2011 after a few months on air because of low ratings. However, not long after, it was announced that Domingo was being tapped to join the elite roster of hosts for Pinoy Big Brother: Unlimited, together with Toni Gonzaga and Bianca Gonzales. A week after the finale of Unlimited, Domingo launched the opening of Pinoy Big Brother: Teen Edition 4 with Gonzaga, Gonzales, and newly minted host, John Prats. He also became a guest star in ABS-CBN's Kahit Puso'y Masugatan late in December 2012, wherein he played the part of Gerald Fernandez opposite Andi Eigenmann's Veronica Salvacion. Aside from this, he was also a semi-regular co-host in Sarah Geronimo's now defunct Sunday night variety show, Sarah G. Live.

After a few months of speculation, it was confirmed that ABS-CBN had decided to tap Domingo as one of the co-hosts for its Philippine franchise of the popular reality show, The Voice of the Philippines in late 2013. He was reunited with Gonzaga for this project, and joined by her younger sister, Alex Gonzaga. In early 2014, he was a host for the second season of ABS-CBN's afternoon reality show, I Dare You, reuniting with Prats, and joined by IDY season 1 host Melisa Cantiveros and Pinoy Big Brother: Unlimited housemate, Denise Joaquin. In addition to this, Domingo was also chosen to be a game master in the second season of the reality show The Biggest Loser Pinoy Edition: Doubles with Matteo Guidicelli in February 2014.

Domingo is announced to return as co-host for the 5th season of "Pinoy Big Brother" dubbed as "Pinoy Big Brother: All In" in April 2014, but it still remains unknown if he will return to co-host "The Voice of the Philippines (season 2)' which is scheduled to air in the middle of 2014. In addition, during the 2014 "MYX Music Awards", it was announced that Domingo was officially back on the roster of "Myx" VJs and was given the segment "Tuesdays with Robi".

Aside from television, Domingo has also starred in a few films, one of which was Cinco, a five-part horror anthology. This film marked the last project that he would have with fellow Gigger Boy AJ Perez before the latter died at the age of 18 in a vehicular accident in Moncada, Tarlac on midnight of April 17, 2011.

Domingo is also an endorser, and among the brands that he has endorsed, is still endorsing or is affiliated with at present time are: Nokia, Oppo, Bench, Coca-Cola, Dole, Greenwich Pizza, Jollibee, Skechers, Globe Telecom, Adidas, Wade Shoes, Anytime Fitness, Gold's Gym, Ray-Ban, The Body Shop, Your Own Time and Folded & Hung. He also took part in the Bench "Uncut: A Bolder Look at the Future" Denim and Underwear Show at the Araneta Coliseum when he tore his sando in the Furne One's Far East segment.

In January 2011, Domingo announced his departure from Bench following his decision not to renew his contract due to busy commitments.

As of 2020, Robi quits again as a host VJ for MYX for the 2nd time due to retrenchment of ABS-CBN's non-renewal of their franchise and also due to COVID-19 pandemic in the Philippines, but still active in mostly Kapamilya programs.

Personal life
Robi is the 2nd Cousin of Pinoy Dream Academy Champion Yeng Constantino.

Filmography

Television

Movies

TV Specials

Awards and nominations

References

External links

1989 births
Living people
Ateneo de Manila University alumni
Filipino male child actors
Filipino male television actors
People from Quezon City
Male actors from Metro Manila
Pinoy Big Brother contestants
Star Magic
VJs (media personalities)
ABS-CBN personalities
Viva Artists Agency